Charles Rowe may refer to:
 Charles Rowe (cricketer) (born 1951), Hong Kong cricketer
 Charles Rowe (footballer) (1882–1959), Australian rules footballer
 Charles Henry Rowe (1893–1943), Irish mathematician